Yannick Noah (born 18 May 1960) is a French former professional tennis player and singer. Noah won the French Open in 1983, and is currently the captain of both France's Davis Cup and Billie Jean King Cup teams. During his nearly two-decade career, Noah captured 23 singles titles and 16 doubles titles, reaching a career-high singles ranking of world No. 3 in July 1986 and attaining the world No. 1 doubles ranking the following month. Since his retirement from the game, Noah has remained in the public eye as a popular music performer and as the co-founder, with his mother, of a charity organization for underprivileged children. Noah is also the father of former NBA player Joakim Noah.

Early life

Born in Sedan, in the north of France in 1960, Yannick Noah is the son of a Cameroonian footballer, Zacharie Noah, and his French wife Marie-Claire. After a sports injury in 1963, Noah's father returned to Africa with his family. He was living in Cameroon when he made his debut in tennis and was discovered at age 11 by Arthur Ashe and Charlie Pasarell. He soon showed an amazing talent that eventually brought him to the French Tennis Federation's training center in Nice in 1971.

Tennis career
Noah turned professional in 1977 and won his first top-level singles title in 1978 in Manila.

Noah became France's most prominent tennis hero in 1983, becoming the first Frenchman in 37 years to win the French Open, one of the four Grand Slam singles events. He dropped only one set during the two-week-long tournament, and defeated the defending champion, Sweden's Mats Wilander, in straight sets in the final, 6–2, 7–5, 7–6. He remains the last and most recent Frenchman to have won the French Open men's singles title.

Noah won the French Open men's doubles title in 1984 (with compatriot and best friend Henri Leconte). He was also the men's doubles runner-up at the 1985 U.S. Open (with Leconte), and the 1987 French Open (with compatriot Guy Forget). In August 1986, Noah attained the world no. 1 doubles ranking, which he would hold for a total of 19 weeks. At the end of 1986, Noah received the ATP Sportsmanship Award, as voted for by other ATP players.

Yannick reached the quarter-final stage or better on 10 occasions at Grand Slam level.

He notably admitted using marijuana prior to matches in 1981, saying that amphetamines were the real problem in tennis as they were performance-enhancing drugs.

In 1992, Noah received the Legion of Honour medal.

Noah was awarded the Philippe Chatrier Award (the ITF's highest accolade) in 2005 and was inducted into the International Tennis Hall of Fame that same year. He remains France's highest male ranked player since the introduction of rankings in 1973.

Noah played on France's Davis Cup team for eleven years, with an overall win–loss record of 39–22 (26–15 in singles, and in 13–7 doubles). In 1982, he was part of the French team which reached the Davis Cup final, where they were defeated 4–1 by the United States.

Davis Cup/Fed Cup captain success
In 1991, Noah captained the French team to its first Davis Cup victory in 59 years, defeating a heavily favoured US team 3–1 in the final.

This feat was repeated in 1996, when Noah coached the French team to defeat Sweden 3–2 in the final held in Malmö.

In 2017, Noah added a third Davis Cup win for France under his guidance as captain, defeating Belgium in the final in Lille.

In 1997, he also captained France's Fed Cup team to its first ever win of that competition when they defeated the Dutch in the final.

Grand Slam singles performance timeline

Grand Slam finals

Singles: 1 (1–0)

Doubles: 3 (1–2)

Career finals

Singles (23 titles, 13 runners-up)

Doubles (16 titles, 9 runners-up)

Music career

After retiring from playing tennis, Noah developed a career as a popular singer, performing throughout Europe. He began his music career in 1991 with the album Black & What, featuring the popular track "Saga Africa", which he made the stadium sing with his players after the famous Davis Cup final win. In 1993, he released the album Urban Tribu with the single "Get on Back", followed by the album Zam Zam in 1998.

With the encouragement of his manager Jean-Pierre Weiller, his musical career got a great boost in 2000 with his self-titled 4th album Yannick Noah, written by Erick Benzi and Robert Goldman. The single "Simon Papa Tara" was written by Robert Goldman. The album also contained songs by Bob Marley and the group Téléphone. In 2005, Noah performed at Bob Geldof's Live 8 concert, a fundraiser aimed at alleviating poverty in Africa.

On 21 July 2009, Noah made his U.S. live debut, headlining a concert in front of a packed house at the popular free outdoor performing arts festival in New York City, Central Park SummerStage. The performance was part of France's global music celebration Fête de la Musique.

In 2010, Yannick made a comeback with the release of Frontières, his eighth album, containing the single "Angela", a tribute to Angela Davis. It also contained a duet with Aṣa in "Hello". On 25 September 2010, he filled the Stade de France for an exceptional concert that was attended by close to 80,000 spectators.

Charity
Noah is active in charity work. He supports Enfants de la Terre, a charity created and run by his mother, Marie-Claire, in 1988. Noah also founded Fête le Mur in 1996, a tennis charity and adaptation for underprivileged children, especially in the poor areas and the banlieues. It is presided by Noah himself. He is also a spokesman for Appel des Enfants pour l'Environnement that was started by the World Wide Fund for Nature (WWF).

He took part in singing with Les Enfoirés to help Les Restos du Cœur. He also took part in telethons and sponsored the Téléthon 2005. He also sponsors the Association Terre-des-Hommes in Massongex (Suisse) and donated proceeds of his 2008 concert of Grands Gamins, to Sol En Si, an AIDS charity.

Partly because of his involvement in a number of charities, Noah topped the list of the most favourite French personalities according to a joint survey of Ifop and Le Journal du Dimanche in 2007.

Personal life
Noah first attended school in Yaounde (Cameroon), where his parents had settled after meeting and marrying in France. He then left Cameroon to attend a sports-and-study program in France under the sponsorship of the French Tennis Federation. He dropped out of the program at age 17 to move to full time tennis schedule.
Noah's father, Zacharie Noah, was a former professional Cameroonian football star who won the French Cup with Sedan in 1961. His mother, Marie-Claire, is a former captain of France's basketball team and teacher. Noah has five children, of whom two are from his first marriage to Cécilia Rodhe (Miss Sweden 1978 and now a sculptor): Joakim (born in 1985) and Yelena (born in 1986). Joakim had a 13-year career in the NBA and represented France in international competitions. Yelena is a model, mildly famous in the world of fashion. They do not live in France but in the U.S. With his second wife, the British model Heather Stewart-Whyte, Noah has two daughters: Elijah (1996) and Jénayé (1997). Now he is married to French TV producer Isabelle Camus, with whom he has a son named Joalukas (born in 2004).

Noah is also the owner of a restaurant in Saint Barthélemy in the French West Indies called Do Brazil.

Problems with the French fiscal authorities 
On 15 July 1996, the French fiscal authorities demanded payment of 6,807,701 francs in back taxes for 1993–1994. The Paris administrative tribunal court confirmed the decision alleging that Noah kept three non-declared bank accounts in Switzerland, the Netherlands and the United States. Noah disputed the court decision as unconstitutional.

Discography

Albums

Re-releases
2004: Yannick Noah / Live (2 CDs – FR #134)
2010: Charango / Pokhara (2 Cds – FR #103)

Singles

References

External links

 
 
 
 
 
 , from Radio France Internationale

1960 births
Living people
Black French sportspeople
French male singers
French male tennis players
French Open champions
French sportspeople of Cameroonian descent
French tennis coaches
People from Sedan, Ardennes
International Tennis Hall of Fame inductees
Grand Slam (tennis) champions in men's singles
Grand Slam (tennis) champions in men's doubles
Sportspeople from Ardennes (department)
Le Coq Sportif
ATP number 1 ranked doubles tennis players